Marcelo Lucero (born February 10, 1980 in San Vicente de Tagua Tagua, Chile) is a Chilean footballer who played as a midfielder for Rangers de Talca of the Chilean Primera División during the 2008 season.

Teams
  O'Higgins 2005-2006
  Rangers 2007-2008
  Provincial Osorno 2009
  Curicó Unido 2010–2011
  Naval 2012

References

External links
 Profile at BDFA 
 

1980 births
Living people
Chilean footballers
Curicó Unido footballers
Rangers de Talca footballers
Provincial Osorno footballers
O'Higgins F.C. footballers
Primera B de Chile players
Chilean Primera División players
Association football midfielders